Artur Günther (1893–1972) was a German art director. He designed the sets for more than a hundred films during a lengthy career.

Selected filmography
 When the Dead Speak (1917)
 Ikarus, the Flying Man (1918)
 Alraune, die Henkerstochter, genannt die rote Hanne (1918)
 The Princess of the Nile (1920)
 The Eyes of the World (1920)
 The Medium (1921)
 La Boheme (1923)
 The Doomed (1924)
 The Man in the Saddle (1925)
 Malice (1926)
 Fedora (1926)
 Tragedy of a Marriage (1927)
 The Harbour Bride (1927)
 When the Young Wine Blossoms (1927) 
 German Women - German Faithfulness (1927)
 The Battle of Bademunde (1931)
 The Invisible Front (1932)
 Jumping Into the Abyss (1933)
 Enjoy Yourselves (1934)
 Decoy (1934)
 The Island (1934)
 The Saint and Her Fool (1935)
 Counsel for Romance (1936)
 The Unknown (1936)
 The Call of the Jungle (1936)
 Carousel (1937)
 Meiseken (1937)
 The Night of Decision (1938)
 Mistake of the Heart (1939)
 The Eternal Tone (1943)
 Quartet of Five (1949)
 Friday the Thirteenth (1949)  
 The Last Year (1951)
 The Call of the Sea (1951)
 Swelling Melodies (1955)

References

Bibliography
 Giesen, Rolf. Nazi Propaganda Films: A History and Filmography. McFarland, 2003.

External links

1893 births
1972 deaths
German art directors
People from Potsdam